A global issue is a matter of public concern worldwide. This list of global issues presents problems or phenomena affecting people around the world, including but not limited to widespread social issues, economic issues, and environmental issues. Organizations that maintain or have published an official list of global issues include the United Nations, and the World Economic Forum.

Global catastrophic risks   

Not all of these risks are independent, because the majority, if not all of them are a result of human activity. 
 Biodiversity loss
 Climate change 
 Destructive artificial intelligence
 Environmental disaster
 Nuclear holocaust
 Pandemic
 current example: COVID-19 pandemic
 Biotechnology risk
 Molecular nanotechnology

United Nations list
The UN has listed issues that it deems to be the most pressing as of 2015:

As part of the 2030 Agenda for Sustainable Development, the UN Millennium Development Goals (2000-2015) were superseded by the UN Sustainable Development Goals (2016-2030), which are also known as The Global Goals. There are associated Targets and Indicators for each Global Goal.

World Economic Forum List
In keeping with their economy-centered view, the World Economic Forum formulated a list of 10 most pressing points in 2016:

Food security
Inclusive growth
Future of work/unemployment
Climate change
Financial crisis of 2007–2008
Future of the internet/Fourth Industrial Revolution
Gender equality
Global trade and investment and regulatory frameworks
Long-term investment/Investment strategy
Future healthcare

Global environmental issues

No single issue can be analysed, treated, or isolated from the others. For example, habitat loss and climate change adversely affect biodiversity. Deforestation and pollution are direct consequences of overpopulation and both, in turn, affect biodiversity. While overpopulation locally leads to rural flight, this is more than counterbalanced by accelerating urbanization and urban sprawl. Theories like the world-system theory and the Gaia hypothesis focus on the inter-dependency aspect of environmental and economic issues. Among the most evident environmental problems are:

Overconsumption – situation where resource use has outpaced the sustainable capacity of the ecosystem. This, along with overpopulation, are the primary factors affecting the severity of all of the rest of the issues on this list.
Overpopulation – too many people for the planet to sustain.
Biodiversity loss
Deforestation
Desertification
Global warming/climate change
Habitat destruction
Holocene extinction
Ocean acidification
Ozone depletion
Pollution
Waste and waste disposal
Water pollution
Resource depletion
Urban sprawl

See also

References

Literature

Global Education Magazine
Global Environmental Politics

External links

The UN's Global Issues page

 
Global inequality
Global